Pourtalès or de Pourtalès may refer to:

People
 Arthur de Pourtalès, Comte de Pourtalès-Gorgier (1844–1928), Swiss-French diplomat
 Bernard de Pourtalès (Bernard Alexandre George Edmond de Pourtalès, 1870–1935), Swiss infantry captain and sailor who competed in the 1900 Summer Olympics
 Friedrich von Pourtalès (1853–1928), German diplomat who served as Ambassador to the Russian Empire
 Guy de Pourtalès (1881–1941), Swiss author
 Hélène de Pourtalès (born Helen Barbey, 1868–1945), American-born sailor who competed for Switzerland in the 1900 Summer Olympics
 Hermann de Pourtalès (Hermann Alexander de Pourtalès, 1847–1904), Swiss sailor who competed in the 1900 Summer Olympics
 James-Alexandre de Pourtalès, Comte de Pourtalès-Gorgier (1776–1855), Swiss-French banker, diplomat, and art collector
 Jean de Pourtales (born 1965), French racing driver
 Louis François de Pourtalès (1824–1880), American naturalist
 Mélanie de Pourtalès (born Mélanie Renouard de Bussière, 1836–1914), French salonnière and courtier

Other uses
Château de Pourtalès, historic chateau in Bas-Rhin, Alsace, France.
Hôtel de Pourtalès, historic building in Paris, France